JDT may refer to:

 Jamaica Dogsled Team
 Johor Darul Takzim, a Malaysian state
 Johor Darul Ta'zim F.C., a Malaysian football club
 Journal of Dermatological Treatment
 Judeo-Tat, a Judeo-Persian language
 Julian date and time
 Java Development Tools, part of the Eclipse IDE
 Japan Daylight Time
 Jon Dahl Tomasson, a Danish footballer and coach